"Julie, Do Ya Love Me" is a song written by Tom Bahler, which was a hit recording in 1970 for Bobby Sherman and later the same year for White Plains.

Bobby Sherman version
In July 1970, Bobby Sherman released "Julie, Do Ya Love Me" as a single, and it appeared on the album With Love, Bobby, which was released the same year.

Bobby Sherman's version spent 15 weeks on the Billboard Hot 100 chart, peaking at No. 5, while reaching No. 2 on Billboards Easy Listening chart, No. 3 on the Cash Box Top 100, No. 3 on Australia's Go-Set chart, and No. 28 on the UK Singles Chart. In Canada, the song reached No. 3 on the "RPM 100" and No. 2 on Toronto's CHUM 30 chart. The song earned Sherman a gold record.Trumpet played by Lloyd Michels, who also played lead for the band on the old Merv Griffin TV show that featured Jack Sheldon in the section.

Chart performance

White Plains version
On October 9, 1970, White Plains released the song as a single, and in 1971 it appeared on the album When You Are a King. White Plains' version spent 14 weeks on the UK Singles Chart, reaching No. 8, while spending 9 weeks on the Irish Singles Chart, also reaching No. 8.

Chart performance

References

1970 songs
1970 singles
Bobby Sherman songs
Deram Records singles